Francis Joseph Bennett (March 4, 1923 – June 22, 1996) was a Canadian professional ice hockey player who played seven games in the National Hockey League with the Detroit Red Wings during the 1943–44 season. The rest of his career, which lasted from 1942 to 1948, was spent in the minor leagues. Bennett was born in Toronto, Ontario.

Career statistics

Regular season and playoffs

External links
 

1923 births
1996 deaths
Canadian expatriate ice hockey players in the United States
Canadian ice hockey left wingers
Detroit Red Wings players
Hershey Bears players
Oshawa Generals players
Providence Reds players
Shawinigan-Falls Cataracts (QSHL) players
Ice hockey people from Toronto
Toronto St. Michael's Majors players